The North Dakota State Auditor is a political office in North Dakota. The auditor's duty is to oversee the four divisions of the Office of the State Auditor: State Audit, which audits the state of North Dakota; Local Government Audit, which performs audits of counties, school districts, and other political subdivisions; Royalty Audit, which performs audits of federal royalty payments from oil, gas, and coal leases located within the state, and Division of North Dakota University System Performance Audit, which conducts university audits. The current state auditor is Josh Gallion. 

Since the creation of the office with the state's constitution in 1889, the state has seen a total of 16 State Auditors. The first eight State Auditors all served within the first 25 years of the office's creation, but since then Auditors such as Robert W. Peterson, who served for 24 years, have served for longer spans of time. The office has been held by the state's Democratic Party only two years; that was from 1893 to 1894 when Arthur W. Porter was elected. All other auditors have been from the North Dakota Republican Party. It is the only statewide office in North Dakota to have never been held by a member of the Nonpartisan League. The Auditor originally served a two-year term, but this was extended to four in 1964 by a constitutional amendment.

See also
 List of North Dakota State Auditors

References

 
North Dakota